Tidal W. "Ty" McCoy (born 1945) was United States Assistant Secretary of the Air Force (Manpower & Reserve Affairs) from 1981 to 1989.

Biography
Ty McCoy was born in Gainesville, Florida on April 25, 1945.  He was educated at the United States Military Academy at West Point, receiving a B.S. in engineering in 1967.  

After graduating from West Point, McCoy joined the United States Army, serving as an Army field artillery officer in command and staff assignments in the United States, Europe, and Vietnam.  He left the Army in 1972, and became a member of the Long-Range Planning and Net Assessment Group in the Office of the United States Secretary of Defense.    From 1973 to 1977, he was Staff Assistant and later a Deputy Assistant to the Secretary of Defense.    In 1977, he was the Scientific Adviser to Assistant Secretary of the Navy for Research, Engineering and Systems David E. Mann.   From 1979 to 1981, he was Assistant for National Security Affairs to Sen. Jake Garn (R–Utah).  

In April 1981, President of the United States Ronald Reagan nominated McCoy to be Assistant Secretary of the Air Force (Manpower & Reserve Affairs), and McCoy subsequently held that office for the duration of the Reagan Administration. McCoy also served as the Acting Under Secretary and Acting Secretary of the Air Force for a period of time throughout the Reagan Administration as well.

After leaving government service in 1989, McCoy joined Thiokol as Senior Vice President for Government Relations.   He later founded the George Washington National Bank and served as the bank's Vice Chairman.   In 1998, he founded Washington Capital Partners, LLC, and has since served as its chairman.

Since May of 2012 McCoy has served on the board of trustees for the Institute of World Politics and became the Vice Chairman in 2018. Additionally, he serves on the board of advisors of the Code of Support Foundation, a nonprofit military services organization.

References

1945 births
Living people